Stephen William Drury is a British-Canadian mathematician and professor of mathematics at McGill University. He specializes in mathematical analysis, harmonic analysis and linear algebra.  He received the doctorate from the University of Cambridge in 1970 under the supervision of Nicholas Varopoulos and completed a postdoctoral training at Faculté des sciences d'Orsay, France. He was recruited at McGill by Professor Carl Herz in 1972.

Among other contributions, he solved the Sidon set union problem, worked on restrictions of Fourier and Radon transforms to curves and generalized the von Neumann's inequality. In operator theory, the Drury–Arveson space is named after William Arveson and him.

His research now pertains to the interplay between matrix theory and harmonic analysis and their applications to graph theory.

References 

Year of birth missing (living people)
Living people
20th-century Canadian mathematicians
21st-century Canadian mathematicians
Academic staff of McGill University
Mathematical analysts
Alumni of the University of Cambridge
20th-century British mathematicians
British emigrants to Canada
21st-century British mathematicians